The Uttarakhand women's cricket team is an Indian domestic cricket team representing the Indian state of Uttarakhand. The team has represented the state in Women's Senior One Day Trophy (List A) and Women's Senior T20 Trophy (T20).

Competitive record

See also
Cricket Association of Uttarakhand
Cricket in India
India women's national cricket team
Uttarakhand cricket team
Women's cricket

References

Indian first-class cricket teams
Cricket in Uttarakhand
2018 establishments in Uttarakhand
Cricket clubs established in 2018